Coilostele is a genus of gastropods belonging to the family Ferussaciidae.

The species of this genus are found in Western Mediterranean, India.

Species:

Coilostele acus 
Coilostele akus 
Coilostele cylindrata 
Coilostele inquirenda 
Coilostele paladilhiana 
Coilostele scalaris 
Coilostele tampicoensis

References

Ferussaciidae